St. Scholastica Catholic Church is a historic church building on the west side of Fourth St., between Wisconsin and State Streets in Letcher, South Dakota.  The St. Scholastica Rectory is its rectory.  The two buildings were separately listed on the National Register of Historic Places in 1994.

Although the first Catholic services were held as early as 1888, at the Letcher School, the small community was not able to muster the resources to build a church until 1900. This structure, of balloon frame and clapboard construction, is "a vernacular example of late Gothic Revival architecture." It was damaged by a tornado in 1924, but repaired and returned to use.

St. Scholastica was canonically recognized as a parish from 1913 to 1979; although the cemetery remains active, it is no longer a community of the Diocese of Sioux Falls. The property was converted to a residence.

The church is cruciform in plan.  It has balloon frame construction on a high poured concrete foundation, and is covered by clapboards.

The rectory is a two-story house which was deemed notable as "a well preserved example of the American Foursquare style which incorporates elements of the earlier Colonial Revival and Queen Anne traditions."

References

Churches in the Roman Catholic Diocese of Sioux Falls
Former Roman Catholic church buildings in South Dakota
Churches on the National Register of Historic Places in South Dakota
Carpenter Gothic church buildings in South Dakota
Roman Catholic churches completed in 1900
Roman Catholic churches completed in 1906
Christian organizations established in 1913
Organizations disestablished in 1979
Buildings and structures in Sanborn County, South Dakota
National Register of Historic Places in Sanborn County, South Dakota
Clergy houses
1888 establishments in Dakota Territory
20th-century Roman Catholic church buildings in the United States